Adrian Francis Breacker (born 1934), is a male former athlete who competed for England.

Athletics career
He represented England and won a gold medal in the 4 x 110 yard relay at the 1958 British Empire and Commonwealth Games in Cardiff, Wales.

References

1934 births
English male sprinters
Commonwealth Games medallists in athletics
Commonwealth Games gold medallists for England
Athletes (track and field) at the 1958 British Empire and Commonwealth Games
Living people
Medallists at the 1958 British Empire and Commonwealth Games